Robert Corff (born October 31, 1947) is an American actor and singer who played the lead in Gas-s-s-s (1970).

He currently is a voice coach.

Filmography

Select theatre credits
Jesus Christ Superstar – New York – 1971
Mass by Leonard Bernstein – Los Angeles – 1972–73
South Pacific – Las Vegas – 1973
Dames at Sea – San Diego – 1974

References

External links
Business website

Living people
American male actors
1947 births
American vocal coaches